The 1989–90 NBA season was the Charlotte Hornets' second season in the National Basketball Association. In the 1989 NBA draft, the Hornets selected J.R. Reid from the University of North Carolina with the fifth overall pick. The Hornets moved from the Eastern Conference to the Western Conference, also switching from the Atlantic Division to the Midwest Division for the season. In December, the team traded Kurt Rambis to the Phoenix Suns for Armen Gilliam. Gilliam would lead the Hornets in scoring averaging 18.8 points per game. Head Coach Dick Harter was replaced by Gene Littles at midseason, following a disappointing 8–32 start. The team finished the season with a record of 19 wins and 63 losses, one game worse than the previous year. Reid was named to the All-Rookie Second Team. Despite the lack of success on the court, the Hornets sold out every home game, finishing second in the NBA in attendance during the season.

Draft picks

Roster

Regular season

Season standings

Record vs. opponents

Game log

Player statistics

Awards and records
 J. R. Reid, NBA All-Rookie Team 2nd Team

Transactions
 August 16, 1989
Signed Clifford Lett as a free agent.
 September 11, 1989
Traded Tim Kempton to the Denver Nuggets for a 1991 2nd round draft pick (Kevin Lynch was later selected).

Signed Jerry Sichting as a free agent.
 September 26, 1989
Signed Kenny Gattison as a free agent.
 September 28, 1989
Signed Terry Dozier as a free agent.
 October 5, 1989
Signed Andre Turner as a free agent.
 October 17, 1989
Traded Robert Reid to the Portland Trail Blazers for Richard Anderson.
 October 19, 1989
Waived Kenny Gattison.
 October 23, 1989
Waived Clifford Lett.
 October 31, 1989
Waived Andre Turner.
 November 1, 1989
Andre Turner claimed on waivers by the Los Angeles Clippers.
 November 23, 1989
Signed Andre Turner as a free agent.
 November 25, 1989
Greg Kite signed as an unrestricted free agent with the Sacramento Kings.
 November 27, 1989
Waived Terry Dozier.
 December 2, 1989
Signed Kenny Gattison as a free agent.
 December 3, 1989
Waived Andre Turner.
 December 13, 1989
Traded Kurt Rambis, a 1990 2nd round draft pick (Negele Knight was later selected) and a 1991 2nd round draft pick (Chad Gallagher was later selected) to the Phoenix Suns for Armen Gilliam.

Signed Robert Reid as a free agent.
 February 22, 1990
Traded Stuart Gray to the New York Knicks for a 1991 2nd round draft pick (Jimmy Oliver was later selected).

Traded a 1991 2nd round draft pick (Jimmy Oliver was later selected) to the Cleveland Cavaliers for Randolph Keys.
 February 23, 1990
Waived Jerry Sichting.
 March 13, 1990
Signed Micheal Williams to the first of two 10-day contracts.
 April 2, 1990
Signed Micheal Williams to a contract for the rest of the season.
 April 14, 1990
Signed Ralph Lewis to a 10-day contract.

Player Transactions Citation:

References

Charlotte Hornets seasons
Char
1989 in sports in North Carolina
Tar